George C. Page Stadium is a baseball venue in Los Angeles, California, USA.  It is home to the Loyola Marymount Lions baseball team of the NCAA's Division I West Coast Conference.  Opened in 1983, it has a capacity of 1,200 spectators.  The stadium is named for George C. Page, head of the Incentive Aid Foundation, which covered much of the venue's construction costs.  Features of Page include a "Blue Monster" in left field, training areas, and reception facilities.

In the stadium's first game, played on March 19, 1983, Loyola Marymount lost to Cal State Fullerton 5-1.  As of 2011, the Lions' all-time record at Page Stadium was 471-352-4 (.572).  Their best single-season mark came in 1988, when they had a 30-5 (.857) record.

Features 
Of the venue's 1,200 person capacity, 200 is theatre seating and 400 is metal bleachers with chairbacks.  Standing room and a first-base side picnic area account for the remaining 600.

The field's generic features include a press box and concession stands, and recent renovations have added more to the facility.

Mikos Blue Monster 
A gift by LMU alumnus Paul Mikos (Class of 1966) allowed the wall and scoreboard to be constructed in 2001.

The Lion's Cage 
The Lion's Cage is an all-weather practice facility that was built during the 2007-08 offseason.  The  facility contains batting cages, pitching mounds, open spaces, and strength and conditioning areas.  Large doors on either side of the den allow for all-weather use.

Pride Park 
Built after the 2004 season, Pride Park is a meeting and reception area at the entrance of Page Stadium.  With a surface modeled as a miniature baseball diamond, it is often used for alumni events.

Other uses 
Page has hosted four West Coast Conference baseball tournaments.  It also hosts youth baseball games and clinics.

The stadium is often used as a filming locale.  Its most notable role in this capacity was in the 1990 movie My Blue Heaven, which starred Steve Martin.

See also 
 List of NCAA Division I baseball venues

References 

College baseball venues in the United States
Baseball venues in California
Loyola Marymount Lions baseball
Sports venues completed in 1983
1983 establishments in California